Hugó Henrik Hoch (1868 – 29 July 1931) was a Hungarian sabre fencer. He competed in the individual sabre event at the 1900 Summer Olympics.

References

External links
 

1868 births
1931 deaths
Hungarian male sabre fencers
Olympic fencers of Hungary
Fencers at the 1900 Summer Olympics
Sportspeople from Somogy County
People from Nagybajom